Fiscal imbalance is a mismatch in the revenue powers and expenditure responsibilities of a government.

In the literature on fiscal federalism, two types of fiscal imbalances are measured: Vertical Fiscal Imbalance and Horizontal Fiscal Imbalance. When the fiscal imbalance is measured between the two levels of government (Center and States or Provinces) it is called Vertical Fiscal Imbalance. When the fiscal imbalance is measured between the governments at the same level it is called Horizontal Fiscal imbalance. This imbalance is also known as regional disparity.

While Horizontal Fiscal Imbalance requires equalization transfers, Vertical Fiscal Imbalance is a structural issue and thus needs to be corrected by reassignment of revenue and expenditure responsibilities between the two senior order of the governments.

Horizontal Fiscal Imbalances as Differences in Net Fiscal Benefits 
A horizontal fiscal imbalance (HFI) emerges when sub-national governments have different abilities to raise funds from their tax bases and to provide services. This creates differences in ‘net fiscal benefits’, which are a combination of levels of taxation and public services. It is these NFBs which are the main cause of horizontal fiscal disparities that in turn generate the need for equalization grants. Prominent among the objectives commonly attributed to intergovernmental fiscal transfers is ‘equalization’ of fiscal capacities or resolution of Horizontal Fiscal Imbalances.

Thus, the transfer system can promote efficiency in the public sector and can level the field for intergovernmental competition. The discussion of horizontal fiscal imbalance and equalisation was of particular importance in the drafting of the new Iraqi constitution. It was a sticking point for the drafting process—with the oil rich regions seeking to minimise the reallocation of revenue while other regions sought to maximise equalisation payments.

Vertical Fiscal Imbalance as a Particular Type of Fiscal Asymmetry 
Though there are multiple usages of the term in the fiscal federalism literature, yet, Sharma (2012) holds that strictly speaking, it shall only be used to denote a particular type of revenue-expenditure asymmetry. This can be understood as follows:

Any existing revenue-expenditure asymmetry between the two levels of a government should simply be called, what it is, that is, a Vertical Fiscal Asymmetry (VFA). The precise nature of this asymmetry, in a particular country, is a matter of research.

Types 

Chanchal Kumar Sharma (2012) steers clear of the confusion in the existing literature and redefines the concepts with great clarity. In his contribution he argues that there can be three types of VFAs:
1. Fiscal asymmetry with fiscal imbalance: Vertical Fiscal Imbalance (VFI). This means inappropriate allocation of revenue powers and spending responsibilities. This state can be remedied by reassignment of revenue raising powers.
2. Fiscal asymmetry without fiscal imbalance but with a fiscal gap: Vertical Fiscal Gap (VFG). This means a desirable revenue-expenditure asymmetry but with a fiscal gap to be closed. This state can be remedied by re-calibration of federal transfers.
3.  Fiscal asymmetry without fiscal imbalance and without fiscal gap: Vertical Fiscal Difference (VFD). This means a desirable revenue-expenditure asymmetry without a fiscal gap ( i.e. gap is closed). This is a state of fiscal asymmetry where there is "no imbalance and no gap" and thus needs no remedial measure.

Further extending the conceptual analytic framework presented by Chanchal Kumar Sharma (2012) which according to Bev Dahlby and Jonathan Rodden provides the most extensive review on the vertical fiscal gap and vertical fiscal imbalance concepts, the authors develop a “political economy model of the VFI and VFG in a federation (see Dahbly and Rodden 2013).

See also
 Fiscal federalism
 Equalization payments
 Cyclical asymmetry

Nations:
 Fiscal imbalance in Australia
 Fiscal imbalance in Canada
 Fiscal imbalance in Nigeria

Further reading 
 Bird, R. M. (2012). Subnational taxation in large emerging countries: BRIC plus one, International Center for Public Policy Working Paper Series, at AYSPS, GSU paper1201, International Center for Public Policy, Andrew Young School of Policy Studies, Georgia State University.

References 

Fiscal federalism
Fiscal policy
Federalism